GSO may refer to:

Organizations
 GCC Standardization Organization, of the Gulf Cooperation Council
 General Statistics Office of Vietnam
 Golden State Overnight, former name of American logistics company GLS-US
 Government Shipping Office, of the Government of Pakistan
 Grassroots Support Organization
 GSO Capital Partners, an American asset management firm

Orchestras
 Gamer Symphony Orchestra at the University of Maryland, US
 Gothenburg Symphony Orchestra, Sweden
 Greenville Symphony Orchestra, South Carolina, US
 Guangzhou Symphony Orchestra, China

Science and mathematics
 Gadolinium oxyorthosilicate, a type of scintillating inorganic crystal
 Generic segmentation offload, in computer networking
 Geosynchronous orbit, an orbit around Earth of a satellite
 Gram-Schmidt orthogonalization, in mathematics
 GSO projection, in superstring theory

Other uses
 General Staff Officer
 GSO Stadium, a former stadium in Limassol, Cyprus
 Piedmont Triad International Airport (IATA and FAA LID codes), North Carolina, US
 Southwest Gbaya language (ISO 639-3 code)